Mike Davis (born May 11, 1992) is a former American football wide receiver. He played college football at Texas.

High school
Davis attended Skyline High School in Dallas, Texas where he was a prep All-American, two-time all-state, two-time first-team all-area and all-district performer at wide receiver. He recorded 129 catches for 2,764 yards and 39 TDs over his final three seasons, helping Skyline post a 37-4 record. He also played in the 2010 Under Armour All-America Game, finishing as the game’s leading receiver with three catches for 53 yards and a TD.

Considered a four-star recruit by Rivals.com, he was rated as the 4th best wide receiver prospect in the nation.

College career
Davis attended the University of Texas at Austin from 2010 to 2013, where he played for the Texas Longhorns football team. He originally was going to enter the 2013 NFL Draft, but changed his mind and returned to Texas for his senior season. He finished his career with 200 receptions for 2,753 yards and 18 touchdowns.

Professional career

Oakland Raiders
Mike Davis signed with the Oakland Raiders on May 10, 2014. The Raiders released Davis on August 24, 2014.

Toronto Argonauts
On February 24, 2015, Davis signed with the Toronto Argonauts of the Canadian Football League. He was released by the Argonauts on May 13, 2015.

Montreal Alouettes 
Davis is currently a member of the Montreal Alouettes of the Canadian Football League and was signed in early 2016.

References

External links
Texas Longhorns bio

1992 births
Living people
Players of American football from Dallas
Under Armour All-American football players
American football wide receivers
Texas Longhorns football players